Yoshishige is a masculine Japanese given name.

Possible writings
Yoshishige can be written using different combinations of kanji characters. Here are some examples: 

義重, "justice, heavy"
義茂, "justice, luxuriant"
義繁, "justice, prosperous/complexity"
吉重, "good luck, heavy"
吉茂, "good luck, luxuriant"
吉繁, "good luck, prosperous/complexity"
善重, "virtuou, heavy"
善茂, "virtuous, luxuriant"
善繁, "virtuous, prosperous/complexity"
芳重, "virtuous/fragrant, heavy"
芳茂, "virtuous/fragrant, luxuriant"
良重, "good, heavy"
良茂, "good, luxuriant"
慶重, "congratulate, heavy"
由繁, "reason, prosperous/complexity
嘉重, "excellent, heavy"
喜繁, "rejoice, prosperous/complexity
好重, "good/like something, heavy"
能重, "capacity, heavy"

The name can also be written in hiragana よししげ or katakana ヨシシゲ.

Notable people with the name
Yoshishige Abe (安倍 能成, 1883–1966), Japanese philosopher, educator, and statesman
, Japanese businessman
, Japanese daimyō
, Japanese samurai
, Japanese daimyō
, Japanese film director and screenwriter

Japanese masculine given names